Pherbellia schoenherri is a species of fly in the family Sciomyzidae. It is found in the  Palearctic . The females lay eggs on the shells of Succineidae including Succinea putris. The resultant larvae consume the animal and pupate within the shell.
P. schoenherri is a very common and widespread species with a very long flight period. It flies mainly from April to October, but in most European countries, it occurs all year round and in a very wide variety of both dry and moist habitats.

References

External links
Images representing Pherbellia schoenherri at BOLD

Sciomyzidae
Insects described in 1826
Muscomorph flies of Europe